Pedro Martínez was the defending champion but lost in the first round to Kimmer Coppejans.

Roberto Carballés Baena won the title after defeating Bernabé Zapata Miralles 6–3, 7–6(8–6) in the final.

Seeds

Draw

Finals

Top half

Bottom half

References

External links
Main draw
Qualifying draw

Copa Sevilla - 1
2022 Singles